This is a list of people who have served as Custos Rotulorum of Denbighshire.

 Sir John Salusbury bef. 1544 – c. 1548
 Sir John Salusbury bef. 1558–aft. 1564
 Robert Dudley, 1st Earl of Leicester bef. 1573–1588
 Sir Thomas Egerton bef. 1594–1596
 Roger Puleston 1596–1618
 Evan Lloyd 1618 – aft. 1621
 Sir Thomas Myddelton 1626 – aft. 1636
 Sir Thomas Salusbury, 2nd Baronet 1642–1643
 William Wynne 1643
 William Price 1643–1646
 Interregnum
 Sir Thomas Myddelton 1660–1666
 Edward Herbert, 3rd Baron Herbert of Chirbury 1666–1678
 Sir Thomas Myddelton, 2nd Baronet 1678–1684
 Sir Richard Myddelton, 3rd Baronet 1684–1688
 William Herbert, 1st Marquess of Powis 1688–1689
 Sir Robert Cotton, 1st Baronet 1689
 Sir William Williams, Bt. 1689–1690
 Sir Richard Myddelton, 3rd Baronet 1690–1699
 Sir Robert Cotton, 1st Baronet 1699–1702
 Sir Richard Myddelton, 3rd Baronet 1702–1716
 Sir Robert Salusbury Cotton, 3rd Baronet 1716–1748
For later custodes rotulorum, see Lord Lieutenant of Denbighshire.

References

Institute of Historical Research - Custodes Rotulorum 1544-1646
Institute of Historical Research - Custodes Rotulorum 1660-1828

Denbighshire